The Double EP: A Sea of Split Peas is an EP by Australian rock musician Courtney Barnett which compiles two of her previous EPs: I've Got a Friend Called Emily Ferris (tracks 7-12) and How to Carve a Carrot into a Rose (tracks 1-6.) It was released by Marathon Artists' House Anxiety Records on October 14, 2013 in the UK, and on the following day in the US.

Composition
Mike Powell for Rolling Stone saw Barnett's sound as "jangly, rumpled" indie rock like that of Pavement and even recalling early Bob Dylan. It also digs into "freewheeling" anti-folk songs like on "History Eraser".

It is also rich in psychedelia sounds, from her "psychedelic-leaning guitar wails" to her "psych-smeared, full-band backing."

Critical reception

Rolling Stones Mike Powell gave the EP 3 out of 5 stars, calling it "an informal introduction to an artist who probably has more to offer." In contrast, AllMusic's Scott Kerr was more favorable in his review of the EP, giving it 4 out of 5 stars and writing that "It's clear to see that together these EPs are an indicator of her wonderful songwriting talent."

The song "Avant Gardener" played over the credits at the end of Season Two of the Netflix series Bojack Horseman.

Track listing

Personnel

All credits adapted from the EP's Bandcamp page.

How to Carve a Carrot into a Rose (2013)

Courtney Barnett and the Courtney Barnetts
 Courtney Barnett, Dave Mudie, Bones Sloane, Dan Luscombe, Alex Hamilton, Pete Convery, Bob Harrow

Technical 
 Dan Luscombe - mixing 
 Dann Hume - mixing 
 Simon Cotter - recording at Headgap 
 Joe at Crystal - mastering

Ive Got a Friend Called Emily Ferris (2012)

Courtney Barnett and the Courtney Barnetts 
 Courtney Barnett, Brent DeBoer, Pete Convery, Alex Hamilton, Peter Lubulwa, Daniel Firth, Alex Francis, Bob Harrow

Technical
 Daniel Firth - recording, mixing
 Joe at Crystal - mastering

Charts

References

Courtney Barnett albums
2013 EPs
Mom + Pop Music albums